The Honda CBX550F is a four-stroke, in line four cylinder, sport tourer motorcycle produced from 1982 to 1986 by the Honda Motor Company. The CBX550F II is identical apart from the addition of a half-fairing.

Honda developed a completely new, unusual design of engine to compete in the middleweight-sector with twin overhead camshafts acting on rockers, having screw-adjusters for clearance which actuated the sixteen valves (four per cylinder).

The engine featured a standard oil-cooler and a distinctive, unusual exhaust system, a first for Honda, with cross-over pipes directly in front of the engine linking cylinders one to four and a separate pair of pipes connecting cylinders two and three. The CV carburettors were of a new type using mixture-enriching internal fuel passages for cold-starts, with careful engineering of the inlet tracts to achieve smooth gasflow.

The machine was noted for its use of inboard ventilated disc brakes, the discs themselves being contained within a "drum" type enclosure. Front suspension was by oil-damped telescopic fork with air assistance and incorporating an anti-dive mechanism in the left fork leg. Rear suspension was by Honda's own "Pro-Link" rising rate system, which allows the suspension forces to vary in accordance with rear wheel movement. The machine was equipped with transistorised ignition and electrics were 12 volt.

See also
Honda CBX series
Honda CBX (disambiguation)

References
Footnotes

Sources
Where not already otherwise noted, specifications obtained from, 

CBX550F
Motorcycles introduced in 1982
Sport touring motorcycles